District 22 of the Oregon State Senate comprises parts of North and Northeast Portland. It is currently represented by Democrat Lew Frederick of Portland.

Election results
District boundaries have changed over time, therefore, senators before 2013 may not represent the same constituency as today. From 1993 until 2003, the district covered parts of Lane and Douglas counties, and from 2003 until 2013 it covered a slightly different area in Portland.

References

22
Multnomah County, Oregon